State Route 275 (SR 275) is a  numbered state highway in Alabama. The route is a western and northern bypass route of Talladega.  Commissioned in 1990, SR 275 is the second incarnation of what was originally the designation for the entire Little River Canyon Rim Parkway.

Route description

SR 275 begins at SR 21, which is a four-lane expressway southeast of Talladega. Northbound SR 21 traffic must turn at SR 275 if they wish to stay on SR 21. Just north of the intersection, SR 275 becomes a two-lane road. Passing through lightly forested areas, SR 275 bypasses Talladega to the west and then curves to the northeast. Near an intersection with SR 77, SR 275 becomes a four-lane, divided highway and remains so until it ends at SR 21 northeast of Talladega. At this intersection, similar to SR 275's southern terminus, southbound SR 21 traffic must turn left in order to stay on SR 21.

Major intersections

References

275
275
Transportation in Talladega County, Alabama